Wikked Lil' Grrrls is Canadian singer Esthero's second album, her first full-length in seven years.  It was released on June 28, 2005 in North America by Reprise Records. The album elicited mixed reviews upon its release, with contemporary music critics generally praising her vocal performance but expressing mixed feelings regarding the record's eclecticism. The album gave Esthero her first album chart entry in the US, reaching number 24 on the US Heatseekers Albums chart. The album includes two singles, "We R in Need of a Musical Revolution" and "Fastlane."

Background and recording
Esthero was dropped from Work in late 1999 due to poor sales of her first album Breath from Another, and the label's absorption into Epic Records. She eventually signed with Reprise Records. Orlando Puerta, marketing director at Reprise Records noted: "Somehow she persevered, and she is special enough for us not to let go of her." Esthero began writing material for her second studio album before her departure from SME. It took over four years and in late 2003 she started recording sessions. In November 2004 a six-song promotional EP entitled We R in Need of a Musical Revolution was released. It features three tracks not included on the album: "The Lull-a-Bye", "I Drive Alone" and "Amber & Tiger's Eye".

Musical style
The album was noted for its diversity of musical styles. Vibe described the album's style as "an alternately futuristic and vintage soundscape of reggae, jazz, hip hop, and electronica." AllMusic's Johnny Loftus commented that the album falls "in a drifty place between modernized trip-hop (and) mild R&B." Regarding the album's stylistic eclecticism, Esthero stated in an interview with The Washington Post that her "taste is so vast it ends up like a premixed iPod shuffle."

Critical reception

The album received generally mixed reviews from most music critics. At Metacritic, which assigns a normalised rating out of 100 to reviews from mainstream critics, the album received an average score of 57, based on 8 reviews, which indicates "mixed or average reviews". Johnny Loftus of Allmusic felt that Wikked Lil' Grrrls is a "personal statement, if not a labor of love", however considers that the album "occasionally gets lost between songwriting, thematics, and stylistic flow". He gave the album 2.5 stars out of 4 and noted "We R in Need of a Musical Revolution", "Everyday Is a Holiday (With You)" and "If Tha Mood" as album's highlights. In extremely negative review from Splendid magazine, Mike Meginnis said: "A towering monument to Esthero's overpowering sense of self satisfaction, this mess overstays its welcome and abuses whatever attention you're willing to spend on it. In short, it's not a career highlight".

Some critics were more favorable in their assessments of the album. Sal Cinquemani, of Slant Magazine, was highly positive in his review of the album, awarding it four out of five stars and commenting that album "establishes her as the progenitor of what could be called electro-ethno-pop". Billboard magazine also was positive, calling the album "another eclectic musical trip". Rolling Stone gave the album three stars out of five and called the album "lyrically feisty and stylistically expanded".

Release and promotion

Singles
The album included two singles."We R in Need of a Musical Revolution," the opening track, was first released as part of a six-song EP of the same name, released in October 2004. An accompanying music video was filmed and released to promote the song, but the single failed to chart. The second single, "Fastlane," premiered in April 2005; it was released commercially in July 2005 as second single from album. It reached number five on the Billboard Hot Dance Club Songs, becoming her second Top 5 on the chart (her first being the non-album single "O.G. Bitch").

Live performances
To promote the album, Esthero appeared on "Jimmy Kimmel Live" on July 7, 2005. She also opened for John Legend.

Commercial performance
The album gave Esthero her first album chart entry in the US. The album debuted at number 24 on the Billboard Heatseekers Albums chart dated July 16, 2005.

Uses in media
The title track appeared on the soundtracks to Miss Congeniality 2 and John Tucker Must Die, a season five episode of Smallville, and was used in an early promotion for the TV shows Desperate Housewives, and Las Vegas. "Everyday Is a Holiday (With You)" was featured in the 2005 film Monster-in-Law, and was used in a season two episode of the ABC medical drama Grey's Anatomy.

Track listing

Personnel and credits
Adapted from AllMusic and album booklet.

Instruments
Scott Alexander — bass
Bryden Baird — horn, trumpet
Colin Barrett — bass
Ron Blake — flugelhorn
Stephen Bradley — horn
Peter Cardinali — bass
William Carn — horn
Terry Clarke — drums
Greg Critchley — drums
Keith Crouch — vox organ
Bob DeAngelis — clarinet
Steven Donald — horn
Steve Dwyer — tenor saxophone
Adrian Eccleston — guitar
Mike Elizondo — bass
Jason Englishman — guitar
Brian Green — drums
Gene Hardy — horn, musical saw
Gordie Johnson — guitar
Oliver Johnson — guitar
Dave Kahne — keyboards
Camara CKmbon — drum programming, keyboards
Larry Kline — bass
Trevor Lawrence — drums
Rick Lazar — percussion
Sean Lennon — keyboards, guitar, piano
Lil Dukes Up — clapping, snaps
Andre Manga — bass
Steve McDade — trumpet
Gabrial McNair — horn
Ravi Naimpally — tabla
Graph Nobel — vox organ
Mike Olsen — cello

Owen Pallett — violin
Terry Promane — trombone
James Robertson — bass, guitar, keyboards
Spookey Ruben — bass
Michael Stewart — alto sax, flute
Tom Szczesniak — piano
Chuck Treece — bass, drums
Brian West — guitar
Malik Worthy — guitar

Production
Adam 12 — keyboards, production, programming
Rick Aoyama — digital editing, engineering
Austin Bascom — drum programming, engineering
Keith Crouch — audio production, production, programming
Matt DeMatteo — mixing
Victor Florencia — mixing
Serban Ghenea — mixing
Mike Haas — engineering
Helix Hadar — engineering
Chad Irschick — engineering
Dave Kahne — programming
Camara Kambon — audio production
James Robinson — audio production, production, programming
Rafa Sardina — vocal engineering
Spookey Ruben — audio production, production, programming
Track and Field — production
Brian West — programming
Malik Worthy — production, programming

Miscellaneous
Michael Creagh — photography
Larry Kline — production concept

Charts

See also
Esthero discography

References

2005 albums
Esthero albums
Soul albums by Canadian artists